The 2004 Swale Borough Council election took place on 10 June 2004 to elect members of Swale Borough Council in Kent, England. One third of the council was up for election and the Conservative Party stayed in overall control of the council.

After the election, the composition of the council was:
Conservative 26
Labour 11
Liberal Democrats 10

Election result
The Conservatives increased their majority on the council after gaining two seats, but also losing one seat to Labour. The Conservatives gains came in Abbey, which they took from Labour, and in Iwade & Lower Halstow from the Liberal Democrats, while the Conservative group leader Andrew Bowles was one of the councillors who retained their seats. However the Labour mayoress of Swale, Jackie Constable, won in Queenborough & Halfway to take the seat from the Conservatives.

Ward results

References

2004
2004 English local elections
2000s in Kent